Haven is a supernatural drama television series developed for television by Sam Ernst and Jim Dunn based on the 2005 Stephen King novel The Colorado Kid. The one-hour drama premiered on July 9, 2010 on Syfy, and concluded on December 17, 2015. Haven tells the story of Audrey Parker (Emily Rose), an FBI Agent with no past and no family, who is sent to the small town of Haven, Maine to investigate the murder of an ex-convict. Partnering with local police officer Nathan Wuornos (Lucas Bryant), Audrey soon discovers that the small town is a safe-haven for people with supernatural abilities and that the town itself may have a shocking connection to her long-missing past. The series is the first property to be produced for Syfy channels around the globe, excluding Canada and Scandinavia.

On January 28, 2014, the show was renewed for a split 26-episode fifth season. The first half aired in 2014, while the second half aired in the last quarter of 2015. In August 2015, Syfy cancelled the series after five seasons.

Series overview

Episodes

Season 1 (2010)

Season 2 (2011)

Season 3 (2012–13)

Season 4 (2013)

Season 5 (2014–15)

References

External links 
 
 List of Haven episodes at The Futon Critic
 List of Haven episodes at MSN TV

List
Lists of American horror-supernatural television series episodes
Lists of American science fiction television series episodes